Marilyn Charles is a psychoanalyst, writer, lecturer and 2014–2015 President of the American Psychological Association's Division 39 (Psychoanalysis). Marilyn Charles has published articles and books on numerous topics, including trauma, Jacques Lacan, Wilfred Bion, creativity, and madness. She is on the staff at Austen Riggs Center, a co-chair of the Division 39 Early Career Committee, and a co-chair of the Association for Psychoanalysis, Society and Culture. She is a contributing editor of APCS's journal, Psychoanalysis, Culture and Society, which is published quarterly by Palgrave Macmillan. Marilyn is affiliated with Harvard Medical School, Boston Graduate School of Psychoanalysis, and the University of Monterrey, and is also a member of the Humanities and Psychoanalysis Committee. In 2014 Marilyn Charles received a leadership award at the 2014 APA Division 39 Spring Meeting, acknowledging her efforts in “the advancement of psychoanalytic psychology as a discipline and practice.”

Selected publications
Patterns: Building Blocks of Experience
Constructing Realities: Transformations Through Myth and Metaphor 
Learning from Experience: a Guidebook for Clinicians  
Working with Trauma: Lessons from Bion and Lacan 
Fragments of Trauma and the Social Production of Suffering 
The Stories We Live: Life, Literature, and Psychoanalysis

References

External links
 Marilyn Charles at the Austen Riggs Center

American women psychologists
21st-century American psychologists
American psychoanalysts
American psychology writers
Living people
Austen Riggs Center physicians
1951 births
21st-century American women
20th-century American psychologists